Love Ya is a CD released by the Fullerton College Jazz Bands and Vocal Jazz for the Discovery Records Trend AM-PM label.  It was first released as a vinyl LP in 1986 and then re-released by the label on digital CD in 1988.  The #1 jazz band was the winner of the 1985 International Association for Jazz Education Disneyworld Competition and the opening band for the 1985 Playboy Jazz Festival as well as being invited to play at the 1986 N.A.J.E. conference.

Background 
In 1981 the Music Department at Fullerton College built a 16 track in house recording facility which was to serve as a teaching tool for both student music groups and students wanting to take recording technology classes at a vocational level.  Love Ya is the fifth of several albums to come out of this studio to feature the award winning Fullerton College Jazz Band.  The CD contains tracks from two of the Fullerton College jazz groups: Jazz Band I and Vocal Jazz.
 
Albert Marx, who was the owner of Discovery Records/Trend Records AM-PM label, became very impressed with the band three years earlier and the level of the music coming from the jazz groups at Fullerton College.   He decided to support the younger, up and coming jazz students/players from the greater Los Angeles/Southern California region by producing certain LPs and CDs.

Track listing

Recording sessions 
 Recorded February 13–15, 1986, Fullerton College, Fullerton, California

Personnel

Musicians 
Conductors: James Linahon and Brent Pierce
Sax (guest soloist): Ernie Del Fante
Trumpet (guest soloist): James Linahon
Piano (guest soloist): Tom Ranier
Oboe (guest soloist): Tom Shoemaker
Drums (guest soloist): Allen Carter
Saxes and woodwinds:  Russell Burt, Yancey Valdez, Brent Vaughan, Dan Freidman, Rob Mader
Trumpets and flugelhorns: John Aranda, Glen Colby, Chris Taylor, Dave Allen and Jeff Archuleta 
Trombones: Richard Acosta, Christine Harms, Alphonse Mosse III, Kurt Godel
Guitar: Jordan Woodruff
Piano: Brad Hurst
Bass: Dave Carpenter
Drums: Eugean Ermel, Steve Teipe
Vocal Jazz: Patricia Figeroa, Dorraine Metzger, Janis Swanson, Dana Lynn Gribble, Kerstin Klopsch, Doug Eash, Mark Henson, Harlan Harris, Ed McCormick, Seth Weiss, Bruce Hart

Production 
Recording, mixing, re-mixing: James Linahon, Randy Beers, John Sirca
Mastering: Bernie Grundman Mastering, Hollywood, CA.
Printing: Stoughton Printing, City of Industry, CA.
Typography: Et Cetera Graphics, Brea, CA.
Album cover design: Mary Naretta
Album art director: Graham Booth, Fullerton College Art Department

Reception 
"...the band seems to delight in numbers with a light, springy tempo such as I Love You; a neat chart to feature the talents of pianist Hirst...The Fullerton College people are, like many others, keeping the spirit of big band music alive and for that they deserve our thanks..."

Jazz Journal International

References

External links

 Official website

1988 albums
Fullerton College Jazz Band albums